Menamuna Kassim Mohamed Aboobakar, who is commonly known as M.K.M. Aboobakar, is an Islamic Indian writer, born 30 April 1937 in Thirukkalachery,   Nagapattinam District, Tamil Nadu, Republic of India. He attended Madras Christian College, Chennai, India

Titles 
 Founder & Managing Trustee - MKM Educational Trust, Thirukkalachery (Present)
 School Principal & correspondent - Aiyas Matriculation H.S. School, Thirukkalachery (Present)
 Elected Village Panchayat President for Thirukkalachery - 1990, 1991 and 1992
 Tamil Cultural Association of Hong Kong, Secretary - 1968 to 1969

Books published 
 Jul 2009 - 'Islamiya Kadamaigal - Arindhathum Ariyaadathum' “இஸ்லாமியக் கடமைகள் - அறிந்ததும் அறியாததும்”(meaning "Duties of a Muslim - Known and the Unknown") in Tamil Language
 May 2010 - 'Karuvarai Mudal Kallarai Varai — Arindhathum Ariyaadhathum' “கருவறை  முதல் கல்லறை வரை - அறிந்ததும் அறியாததும்” (meaning “Journey from Birth till Death - Known and the Unknown facts”) in Tamil Language.
 Apr 2011 - 'Islamiya Pengalin Urimaigal — Arindhathum Ariyaadhathum' “இஸ்லாமியப்  பெண்கள்ளின்  உரிமைகள்  -  அறிந்ததும்  அறியாததும்” (meaning “Rights of Islamic Women - Known and the Unknown”) in Tamil Language.

References 
 Book Review in The Hindu Newspaper, India - 22/06/2010
 Book Review in The Hindu Newspaper, India - 31/05/2011

Living people
20th-century Indian non-fiction writers
1937 births